Erazm Rudolf Fabijański, also Fabjański or Fabiański (1826, Żytomierz — 17 July 1892, Kraków) was a Polish painter, illustrator and set designer.

Biography 
The details of his early life are unclear. He apparently began by studying medicine in Kiev, then switched to the Imperial Academy of Arts in Saint Petersburg, where he studied painting and lithography. In 1848, he was one of the artists who provided illustrations for Topographical Anatomy of the Human Body by Nikolay Pirogov.

From 1852 to 1860, he was Director of the theater in Żytomierz, where he designed sets for an early production of Halka, by Stanisław Moniuszko. In 1857, he created several lithographs of the Church of the Tithes, which appeared in the Gallery of Kiev Antiquities. During this time, he married an actress named Helena Zielinska.

In 1861 he was briefly jailed for "patriotic activities". Following his release, he moved to Warsaw, where he wrote for the Kurier Warszawski and provided illustrations for Tygodnik Illustrowany and the satirical journal Kłosy (Ears).

Two years later, he participated in the January Uprising. When it was suppressed, he went into a self-imposed exile, first in Vienna, then to France, where he may have worked as a decorator in Marseille before going to Paris. Later, he joined the French Foreign Legion and was wounded fighting in the Franco-Prussian War. After 1871, he returned to Poland and settled in Lwów, where he painted murals at St. George's Cathedral and created sets for several operas.

In 1880, he moved to Kraków, where he decorated churches and theaters; occasionally travelling to paint in other cities. Today, he is remembered largely for his numerous cityscapes and architectural paintings. His son, Stanisław, born while he was in Paris, also became a painter; best known for his cityscapes.

References

External links 

 More works by Fabijański @ the National Museum, Kraków

1826 births
1892 deaths
19th-century Polish painters
19th-century Polish male artists
Polish illustrators
Polish set decorators
Polish scenic designers
Polish muralists
Polish people of Ukrainian descent
Artists from Zhytomyr
19th-century Polish artists
Polish male painters